Heim Church is a parish church of the Church of Norway in Heim municipality in Trøndelag county, Norway. It is located in the village of Heim, on the shore of the Hemnfjorden. It is the church for the Heim parish which is part of the Orkdal prosti (deanery) in the Diocese of Nidaros. The white, wooden church was built in a long church style in 1884 using plans drawn up by the architect A.H. Thoresen from Kristiansund. The church seats about 150 people.

History
On 30 September 1882, a royal resolution authorized the creation of the new Heim parish. Construction on the wooden church was started in 1883. The church was built to serve the people in the Heim area since the trip to the main Hemne Church in Kyrksæterøra was long by road or boat, plus that church was full to capacity with the people of that area. The church was consecrated on 16 January 1884. In 1962, the church was renovated and restored.

See also
List of churches in Nidaros

References

Heim, Norway
Churches in Trøndelag
Long churches in Norway
Wooden churches in Norway
19th-century Church of Norway church buildings
Churches completed in 1884
1884 establishments in Norway